St. James' Anglican Church (Saint James Parish of Vancouver, BC) is a unique church building in the Diocese of New Westminster of the Anglican Church of Canada located at the north-east corner of East Cordova Street (formerly Offenheimer Street) and Gore Avenue in the City of Vancouver, British Columbia, Canada in what is now its east Downtown and Strathcona neighbourhoods containing the Downtown Eastside district (originally Japantown).

The original building was completed in the spring of 1881 on Alexander Street (west of Main Street) in the Town of Granville (aka Gastown), Burrard Inlet to the north west of the present site and was sponsored by Captain James Raymur, the manager of Hastings Mill. Granville was renamed Vancouver and the town was incorporated as a city on April 6, 1886. This building burned down in the Great Vancouver Fire of June 13, 1886. The heat of the fire melted the church bell into a puddle that was eventually put on display at the Museum of Vancouver.

The present (and third) church building was designed by Adrian Gilbert Scott who later designed the Church of St. Mary and St. Joseph, Poplar, London, England which has architectural similarities. The building is the second to be built at this location on land (east of Main Street) donated by the Canadian Pacific Railway after the fire. Its design is a combination of Art Deco, Romanesque Revival, Byzantine Revival, and Gothic Revival architecture. The walls are made of reinforced concrete, while the roof is made of slate. The building was constructed between 1935 and 1937 and consecrated in 1938.

St. James was the first Anglican parish in Vancouver, formerly Granville (aka Gastown), until the establishment of Christ Church (local church), a daughter church, in 1888 that in 1929 became Christ Church Cathedral - the Diocese's second cathedral. Another daughter church, St. Paul's Anglican Church, was established in 1889, and later became a separate parish and is located in the city's West End.

The worship tradition is Anglo-Catholic. Offices of Morning and Evening Prayer are said daily. Said (Low) Mass is celebrated daily except Saturdays. A Solemn (High) or Sung Mass is sung every Sunday at 10:30 a.m.

The Rector of St James Parish of Vancouver is The Venerable (Father) Kevin Hunt, Archdeacon of Burrard. Andrew Campbell is the Rector's Warden. The other Wardens are Peggy Smyth and Leah Postman. In addition to the Rector and Wardens, the other voting members of the Parish's Board of Trustees are its Lay Delegates to Synod: Jenny Johnson, Pamela McDonald, Ross Hornby, and, its Non-Voting Trustees, the Secretary, Linda Adams, and the Treasurer, Reece Wrightman. The Parish Council usually meets quarterly and is chaired by Louisa Farrell and its secretary is Reece Wrightman. The Parish Vestry meets annually or more often as needed. The Vestry Clerk is Linda Adams.

References

External links

 Processional Hymn "Lift high the Cross"
 Recessional Hymn "Ye Watchers and ye Holy Ones" - arr. PJ Janson

1881 establishments in British Columbia
20th-century Anglican church buildings in Canada
Adrian Gilbert Scott buildings
Anglican church buildings in Vancouver
Anglo-Catholic church buildings in Canada
Art Deco architecture in Canada
Burned buildings and structures in Canada
Neo-Byzantine architecture
Churches in Vancouver
Gothic Revival architecture in Vancouver
Rebuilt churches in Canada
Churches completed in 1937
Romanesque Revival church buildings in Canada